Tachytes desertus is a species of square-headed wasp in the family Crabronidae.

References

Crabronidae
Articles created by Qbugbot
Insects described in 1994